This is a list of seasons completed by the Oklahoma State Cowboys men's college basketball team.

Seasons

 

 Voted 1st in Missouri Valley Conference in 1944 and 1945 as there was no league play due to World War II

References

 
Oklahoma State Cowboys
Oklahoma State Cowboys basketball seasons